The Cadillac Imaj is a concept car that was unveiled by Cadillac at the Geneva Motor Show in 2000. The luxurious liftback continued Cadillac's idea of the design Art and Science-design concept. It continued the sharp edges of the Evoq concept, unveiled a year earlier.

The engine was 4.2 L-Northstar-V8 with 32 valves and 425 hp (312.5 kW). A new five-speed automatic transmission transferred was coupled to an all-wheel-drive powertrain.

Features: Automotive night vision, Automotive head-up display, Autonomous cruise control system.

References

External links 
Cadillac Media Photos and description of Imaj

Imaj
Hatchbacks